Bezobrazovo is a rural locality in Besedinsky Selsoviet Rural Settlement, Kursky District, Kursk Oblast, Russia. Population:

Geography 
The village is located on the Rat River (a right tributary of the Seym), 110 km from the Russia–Ukraine border, 17 km east of the district center – the town Kursk, 6 km from the selsoviet center – Besedino.

 Climate
Bezobrazovo has a warm-summer humid continental climate (Dfb in the Köppen climate classification).

Transport 
Bezobrazovo is located 6 km from the federal route  (Kursk – Voronezh –  "Kaspy" Highway; a part of the European route ), 1 km from the road of intermunicipal significance  (Otreshkovo – Petrovskoye – Besedino), on the road  (38N-530 – Bezobrazovo), 5 km from the nearest railway station Otreshkovo (railway line Kursk – 146 km).

The rural locality is situated 18 km from Kursk Vostochny Airport, 122 km from Belgorod International Airport and 185 km from Voronezh Peter the Great Airport.

References

Notes

Sources

Rural localities in Kursky District, Kursk Oblast